Heterocypris is a genus of ostracods belonging to the family Cyprididae.

The genus has cosmopolitan distribution.

Species:
 Heterocypris americana (Cushman, 1905)
 Heterocypris antillensis Broodbakker, 1982

References

Cyprididae